The John Pope House, also known as Eastview, is a historic house in Burwood, Williamson County, Tennessee. It incorporates hall-parlor plan architecture and single pen architecture.

History
The original part of the house was built of logs circa 1806 by slaves for Reverend John C. Pope, a veteran of the American Revolutionary War and a lay Methodist minister. Originally it "was one of the more ornate log residences built during this period in the county with wainscoting, chair rails and plaster walls." Pope conducted well-attended camp meetings at locations around the area. He owned 2,200 acres by 1805, and 37 slaves by 1820. He deeded land for the construction of a chapel nearby in 1818. He was married twice, and he had 15 children. His granddaughter, Edith Pope, was the president of the Nashville No. 1 chapter of the United Daughters of the Confederacy and second editor of the Confederate Veteran.

The house has exterior brick chimneys and a standing metal seam gable roof and rests on a stone foundation.  It was modified c.1880 with addition of weatherboard and with replacement/addition of four-over-four sash windows.  In c.1920 a multi-light entrance doorway and a one-story frame addition to the rear were added.  The addition gained metal siding c.1940.  The main (east) facade gained, c.1950, a one-story gable roof porch with square Doric columns and square baluster railing;  a similar porch has also been added to the north facade.

Its interior includes original Federal-style mantels on its second floor.  As of 1988 the house sat "on a hillside on a several hundred acre farm and retains its original site and setting."

The house was listed on the National Register of Historic Places in 1988. The property was covered in a 1988 study of Williamson County historical resources.

References

Houses on the National Register of Historic Places in Tennessee
Houses in Williamson County, Tennessee
Hall-parlor plan architecture in Tennessee
Single pen architecture in Tennessee
Houses completed in 1806
National Register of Historic Places in Williamson County, Tennessee